John McInnes (born 7 July 1939) is a Canadian ski jumper. He competed at the 1964 Winter Olympics and the 1968 Winter Olympics.

References

External links
 

1939 births
Living people
Canadian male ski jumpers
Olympic ski jumpers of Canada
Ski jumpers at the 1964 Winter Olympics
Ski jumpers at the 1968 Winter Olympics
Sportspeople from New Westminster